East Hertfordshire District Council is elected every four years.

Elections Summary and Political control

The Council had 48 members at the 1973 and 1976 elections, afterwards the council had 50 members.

Leadership
The leaders of the council since 2001 have been:

Council elections
1973 East Hertfordshire District Council election
1976 East Hertfordshire District Council election
1979 East Hertfordshire District Council election (New ward boundaries)
1983 East Hertfordshire District Council election
1987 East Hertfordshire District Council election (District boundary changes took place but the number of seats remained the same)
1991 East Hertfordshire District Council election
1995 East Hertfordshire District Council election (District boundary changes took place but the number of seats remained the same)
1999 East Hertfordshire District Council election (New ward boundaries)
2003 East Hertfordshire District Council election
2007 East Hertfordshire District Council election
2011 East Hertfordshire District Council election
2015 East Hertfordshire District Council election
2019 East Hertfordshire District Council election

By-election results

See also 

 East Hertfordshire District Council

References

External links
East Hertfordshire District Council

 
Local elections
Council elections in Hertfordshire
District council elections in England